Dennis Overbye (born June 2, 1944, in Seattle, Washington) is a science writer specializing in physics and cosmology and is the cosmic affairs correspondent for The New York Times.

Biography
Overbye received his B.S. in physics from M.I.T.—where he was a member of the Alpha Mu chapter of Phi Kappa Sigma—in 1966. He started work towards a master's degree in astronomy from U.C.L.A. in 1970.

Overbye started his career by working as a scientist for Boeing and then other companies. In 1976 he became assistant editor at Sky and Telescope magazine. From 1976 to 1980 he was a senior editor at Discover magazine. Subsequently, he embarked on a freelance career, during which time he published articles in Time, Science, the Los Angeles Times, and The New York Times, among other publications.

He has written two books: Lonely Hearts of the Cosmos, about scientists and their quest to understand the universe, and Einstein in Love, dealing with Albert Einstein's youth and the controversy surrounding the degree to which Einstein's first wife, Mileva Marić, contributed to the theory of relativity.  He joined the staff of The New York Times in 1998 as deputy science editor, then switched to full-time writing.  In 2014 he was a finalist for the Pulitzer Prize for Explanatory Reporting.

Overbye lives in New York City with his wife, Nancy Wartik, their daughter Mira Overbye and two cats.

Books
 Lonely Hearts of the Cosmos: The Scientific Quest for the Secret of the Universe, Harper-Collins (1991),  &  (finalist, Nation Book Critics Circle Award for non-fiction). Second edition (with new afterword), Back Bay, 1999.
 Einstein in Love: A Scientific Romance, Viking (2000),

Awards
 American Institute of Physics Science Writing Award, 1980 and 1992
 American Association for the Advancement of Science Science Journalism Award, 2005 (for large newspaper writing)

References

External links

Bio on Edge.org
New York Times author index page
Interview with Overbye on the Marketing for Scientists blog

Science journalists
Living people
American science writers
The New York Times writers
Los Angeles Times people
American magazine editors
1944 births
Discover (magazine) people
MIT Department of Physics alumni